Layla Sarahat Rushani (ca. 1952-54 – July 21, 2004) was an Afghan poet. Her first name also appears as Laila.

The daughter of  Sarshar Rushani, a journalist who was executed by the ruling communist party, she was born in Charikar and studied at Kabul University. Her sister died in Australia and her mother died soon afterwards. She published a number of poetry collections, consisting mainly of modern Persian poems.

Rushani left Afghanistan for the Netherlands due to the persecution of women by the Taliban. She published a literary journal in Persian, Eve in Exile, there. She died of brain cancer in 2004.

References 

Year of birth uncertain
2004 deaths
Kabul University alumni
20th-century Afghan poets
Afghan women writers
Afghan writers
Afghan women poets
20th-century women writers
20th-century Afghan women writers
21st-century Afghan women writers